Robert (Bob) Lord is an American business executive, serving as a Senior Vice President at IBM. Lord oversees The Weather Company and Alliances, Watson Advertising and TradeLens. Prior to his current role, Lord served as Senior Vice President of IBM’s Worldwide Ecosystems business, where he transformed the ecosystem business, making it core to IBM’s go-to-market strategy. Kicking off his career at IBM, Lord served as the company’s first Chief Digital Officer in 2016. 

In 2015, Lord became President of AOL, leading the company through its evolution into a leading, global advertising platform. Prior to AOL, Lord served as CEO of Razorfish in 2010, working with companies such as Cisco, Condé Nast, Ford, Mercedes-Benz and Pfizer. Notably, Lord was named one of CRN’s 50 “Most Influential” channel chiefs in 2022. He is also the co-author of “Converge: Transforming Business at the Intersection of Marketing and Technology.”

Early life 
Lord was born in Hackensack, New Jersey to Robert A. Lord and Pauline Ann Lord. He has two sisters, Cathie and Nancy.

Education 
Lord started his career as an engineer, graduating from Syracuse University with a BS in industrial engineering. While at Syracuse, he was an Industrial Engineering and Co-Operative Educations honors student and member of Sigma Chi (1981–1985).  Lord achieved one of the fraternity’s highest honors, The Significant Sig Award, which recognizes alumni whose exemplary achievements in their fields of endeavor have brought great honor and prestige to the name of Sigma Chi.

Furthering his education, he attended Harvard Business School and graduated with an MBA in Administration and Management.[1]

Career 
In June of 1983, Lord’s first job out of college was a shift supervisor and industrial engineer at General Motors. After a year, Lord began working at Corning Inc. as a senior industrial project engineer and marketing project engineer. He worked in this role between June 1985 to September 1988.

In 1990, Lord went on to become the senior principal consultant and project manager at Symmetrix. After leaving Symmetrix in 1995, Lord became the area vice president of Contract Services for NovaCare until leaving in 1996. He then joined Advanced Rehab Services (later renamed Prism Rehab Services), where he served as chief operating officer until 1998 and served as executive vice president of Prism Rehab Services until 1999.

In 2000, Lord became the vice president of client support services for agility.com and left within the same year to become the vice president of corporate alliances and business development at Pretzel Logic Software. In November 2000, Lord left Pretzel Logic to become the executive vice president of North America Razorfish.

In 2002, he became the chief operating officer of Razorfish Inc. Then in 2003, Lord successfully sold Razorfish to SBI Inc. and became executive vice president of SBI-Razorfish Inc. 

In 2004, Lord became the East Region president of Razorfish, a subsidiary of aQuantive (AQNT). Three years later, he went on to serve as the East Region president of Razorfish, a subsidiary of Microsoft. Then in 2010, Lord became the global CEO of Razorfish, subsidiary of Publis Group. Continuing his role as a CEO, Lord went on to serve as the global CEO of VivaKi Interactive at Razorfish in 2011. 

During his time at Razorfish, Lord co-authored the book Converge: Transforming Businesses at the Intersection of Marketing and Technology, which discusses how technology, media, and creativity are uniting and how this shift is revolutionizing marketing and business strategy.[2]

In 2013, Lord left Razorfish to work as CEO of AOL Platforms. Then, in 2015 Lord became the president of AOL. Lord grew AOL revenues from $1.5 B to over $3.0 B through both mergers and aquistions and organic growth. He then sold AOL to Verizon for $4.4 billion in June 2015 and positioned AOL to become a world leader in the Mobile Media landscape. Following his success at AOL, Lord joined IBM.

IBM
In early 2016, Lord started his career at IBM as the company’s first chief digital officer. In this role, Lord oversaw the Digital Platforms team, Digital Sales organization, Digital Marketing, Routes to Market and Offering teams, and IBM's Developer and Startup Ecosystem [1].  

In 2019, Lord became senior vice president of IBM’s Worldwide Ecosystems, managing the $4B portfolio including IBM’s Supply Chain, IOT and Talent product lines. During this time, Lord also launched Call for Code, the largest and most ambitious effort to bring together software developers across the globe with the goal of tackling pressing societal issues with the use of advanced technologies and cutting-edge solutions. To date, more than 500,000 developers and problem solvers across 180 nations have answered the call.

Currently, Lord is the IBM senior vice president of The Weather Channel and Alliances, overseeing The Weather Company, Watson Advertising, and TradeLens. He is responsible for driving growth within these organizations and leading IBM’s strategic partnership transactions. 

Under Lord’s leadership, IBM Watson Advertising and The Weather Channel launched its approach to tackling bias in advertising. Lord spearheaded The Advertising Toolkit for AI Fairness, an open-source collection of data and fairness explainers that helps the advertising industry prevent and remove biases in their machine learning models. In 2022, Lord debuted this toolkit at the Cannes Lions International Festival of Creativity and co-hosted a panel discussion with American Actress Issa Rae to discuss steps companies can take the mitigate racial bias in AI and advertising.

Outside of his day-to-day role, Lord serves as the Executive Sponsor for IBM’s Black Business Resource group. Joining in 2020, Lord has served as an advocate for economic development, mentorship and professional growth for IBM’s Black community members.

Membership
Lord is an active member of the TED community and founding member of the Nantucket Project. He is a board member of the Partnership for New York City and Aqua Finance, board member for the Trustworthy Accountability Group (TAG) and former board member for Williams-Sonoma, Inc.[5] and Screen Vision Media.

Personal life
Lord is married to Robin Lord. They have three children, Emily, Andrew and Paige.  When Lord’s not spending time with his family, he enjoys biking, surfing, golfing and competing in triathlons.

References

American technology chief executives
Syracuse University alumni
Harvard Business School alumni
1963 births
Living people
AOL people
Place of birth missing (living people)
IBM employees
American corporate directors
American business writers